Woodhey Cross is a late medieval stone cross, probably dating from the early 16th century, located near Faddiley in Cheshire, England. The structure is grade II* listed and is also a scheduled ancient monument.

The cross is constructed of red sandstone and stands around 130 cm high. It consists of a square shaft inserted into a large square base block, which rests on two levels of steps; the steps are formed of several stone pieces. No carving or inscription can be discerned.

See also
List of Scheduled Monuments in Cheshire (1066–1539)
Listed buildings in Faddiley

References

Grade II* listed buildings in Cheshire
Scheduled monuments in Cheshire
Wayside crosses